Finlaysonia is a genus of flowering plants in the dogbane family Apocynaceae, found from Sri Lanka, India, through Southeast Asia, New Guinea, northern Australia, the Philippines, and Palau. They tend to be vines or climbers and prefer to live on limestone, alongside rivers, or in mangrove swamps.

Species
Species currently accepted by The Plant List are as follows: 
Finlaysonia curtisii (King & Gamble) Venter
Finlaysonia insularum  (King & Gamble) Venter
Finlaysonia khasiana  (Kurz) Venter
Finlaysonia lanuginosa  (Ridl.) Venter
Finlaysonia obovata  Wall.
Finlaysonia pierrei  (Costantin) Venter
Finlaysonia wallichii  (Wight) Venter

References

Apocynaceae genera
Periplocoideae